Ministro Pistarini International Airport , also known as Ezeiza International Airport owing to its location in Ezeiza in Greater Buenos Aires, is an international airport  south-southwest of the autonomous city of Buenos Aires, the capital city of Argentina. Covering  it is one of two commercial airports serving Buenos Aires and its metropolitan area, along with Aeroparque Jorge Newbery. Pistarini Airport is the country's largest international airport by number of passengers handled—85% of international traffic—and is a hub for international flights of Aerolíneas Argentinas, which operates domestic services from the airport as well. It has been operated by Aeropuertos Argentina 2000 S.A. since 1998.

History 
The airport is named after Juan Pistarini, Minister of Public Works during the presidency of Juan Perón, who placed the cornerstone of the project on 22 December 1945. It was designed and erected by Argentine technicians. Its construction, which took four years to be completed, was one of the major projects in the five-year plan of the first presidency of Juan Perón.  The airport was inaugurated on 30 April 1949. When it opened it was the third-largest airport in the world. A 1949 diagram shows three runways crossing at 60-degree angles:  runway 10/28,  4/22 and  16/34.

The Ezeiza massacre took place near the airport in 1973.

Operations 
Since December 2012, citizens from countries requiring an entry visa for Argentine nationals including Australia and Canada are charged a "reciprocity fee" to enter Argentina, equivalent to the price the countries charge Argentine citizens for a visa. Until  the tax was collected, in Argentine pesos or US dollars, at the airport; since then, the tax must be paid in advance online from the country of origin. As of 23 August 2016, the Argentine Government (Presidential Decree No. 959/2016) has resolved to suspend the collection of the reciprocity fee from US passport holders who visit the country for less than 90 days, for tourist or business purposes.

In October 2012, Ezeiza Airport recorded the highest annual traffic growth of all the airports operated by Aeropuertos Argentina 2000. For this month, the airport handled 767,824 passengers, a 10.9% increase compared to the previous October; the volume of international and domestic traffic for October 2012 increased 8.7% and 108.3%, respectively, year-on-year. Overall, 2012 traffic figures for the airport indicated a 7.3% increase over the previous year. Figures for July 2013 showed that the airport handled 688,397 passengers, an 8.9% decrease over the previous year.

Terminals 

Airlines and destinations

Passenger

Cargo

Route development
Qantas withdrew its service to the airport in favour of Santiago de Chile in March 2012; flights to Ezeiza Airport had begun in November 2008. This followed Malaysia Airlines' termination of its Boeing 747-served Kuala Lumpur–Cape Town–Buenos Aires route in early 2012 to cut costs. Aerolíneas Argentinas discontinued the Auckland stopover on the Buenos Aires–Sydney run in July 2012; Sydney was removed from the airline's network in April 2014. South African Airways discontinued its Johannesburg–Buenos Aires service in March 2014.

In , Qatar Airways launched direct flights between the airport and Doha, but in August 2020 cancelled the route. After a ten-year gap, KLM resumed operations at the airport in October 2011. Turkish Airlines extended its Istanbul–São Paulo service to end at Ezeiza in December 2012. Air New Zealand started non-stop flights between the airport and Auckland in December 2015, but discontinued them in 2020. United Airlines cancelled non-stop flights from Newark, New Jersey, in October 2019.

In January 2018, Aerolineas Argentinas cancelled the non-stop flight to Barcelona. Later, low-cost carriers LEVEL and Norwegian started long-haul flights to Ezeiza airport from Barcelona and London-Gatwick, respectively. The Norwegian carrier discontinued the route in April 2020. Ethiopian Airlines and Swiss carrier Edelweiss Air launched new flights to Buenos Aires. Aerolíneas Argentinas started flights to Orlando in December 2019, but in March 2020 the route was discontinued. LATAM Argentina ended its operations in June 2020 and discontinued routes to Miami and Brazil. In July 2020, American Airlines discontinued its Los Angeles route.

Statistics

Accidents and incidents 
, Aviation Safety Network records 30 accidents/incidents for aircraft that departed from the airport or had it as a destination. The list below provides a summary of the fatal events that took place at or in the vicinity of the airport.

 23 October 1996: Argentine Air Force Flight 5025, a Boeing 707-320C, registration LV-LGP, was operating a cargo service when it struck the ground short of the runway on final approach to Ezeiza inbound from Arturo Merino Benítez International Airport in Santiago, Chile. The aircraft broke up and burst into flames. Two occupants of the aircraft lost their lives.
 26 October 2003: CATA Línea Aérea Flight 760, a Fairchild FH-227B, tail number LV-MGV, was operating a nonscheduled Ezeiza–Corrientes freighter service when it encountered technical difficulties shortly after takeoff from Ezeiza Airport. The aircraft attempted a belly landing on a nearby golf course. The aircraft skidded some 200 m before hitting a tree and bursting into flames. All five occupants of the aircraft died in the accident.

See also 
 List of airports in Argentina
 List of the busiest airports in Argentina
 Transport in Argentina

References

External links 

 Official website
 Aeropuertos Argentina 2000
 
 

Ezeiza, Buenos Aires
Airports established in 1949
1949 establishments in Argentina
Airports in Buenos Aires Province